Tsuzuki may refer to:

Places
Tsuzuki-ku, Yokohama
Tsuzuki District, Kyoto

People with the surname
Ryota Tsuzuki, footballer
Tsuzuki Yoneko, go player

See also
Suzuki (disambiguation)

Japanese-language surnames